I midvintertid, en jul på Gotland is a Christmas album by Ainbusk, released in November 2001.

Track listing
Det sista vi har kvar (Happy Xmas (War Is Over))
Stilla natt (Stille Nacht, heilige Nacht)
Jul, jul, strålande jul
En julsaga (Fairytale of New York), duet with Håkan Hemlin
I juletidens timma (Have Yourself a Merry Little Christmas)
Var hälsad, sköna morgonstund
Under stjärnan
Förevigt nu (Forever Young)
Härlig är Jorden (Schönster Herr Jesu)
Godnattvalsen (Auld Lang Syne)
Betlehems stjärna
Bach Christmas Oratorio (interruption of part 1)
Hemma

Chart positions

References

2001 Christmas albums
Ainbusk albums
Christmas albums by Swedish artists
Folk Christmas albums
Pop Christmas albums
Stockholm Records albums